Estonia has competed at the European Games since the inaugural 2015 Games.

European Games

Medals by Games

Medalists

By sport

See also
 Estonia at the Olympics
 Estonia at the Youth Olympics

References